WXLZ may refer to:

 WXLZ (AM), a radio station (1140 AM) licensed to serve St. Paul, Virginia, United States
 WXLZ-FM, a radio station (107.3 FM) licensed to serve Lebanon, Virginia, United States